Uaroo Station is a pastoral lease that operates as a cattle station and has previously operated as a sheep station.

The property shares boundaries with Nanutarra, Glenflorrie, Winning, Nyang and Yanrey Stations. About one third of the property is made up of sandy plain country that supports spinifex grasslands dived by rugged hills and ridges.

Established at some time prior to 1901, the property was owned by Joseph McCarthy at that time. The store at Uaroo was important to the many prospectors in the area as it was the only place they could obtain provisions, the next nearest being at Onslow. McCarthy was running sheep at the time. In 1923 a flock of 15,239 sheep were grazing on the property.

In 1953 the pastoral company that owned the property sold it for £27,500 including the flock of 7,000 sheep. The purchaser was Michael Stroud, of Koodarrie.

The station sold in 2012 along with neighbouring Nanutarra Station; the two were being operated as one holding. The property contains 70 equipped watering points along with many permanent and semi-permanent waterholes along the creek and river systems. Both properties had been acquired by Andrew Forrest, the chairman of Fortescue Metals Group, who also owns Minderoo Station, north of Uaroo.

See also
List of ranches and stations

References

Pastoral leases in Western Australia
Stations (Australian agriculture)
Pilbara